Pagrus is a genus of fish in the family Sparidae.
It contains at least six described species:

Pagrus africanus, Southern common seabream (Akazaki, 1962)
Pagrus auratus, Silver seabream or Australasian snapper (Forster, 1801) 	
Pagrus auriga, Redbanded seabream (Valenciennes, 1843) 	
Pagrus caeruleostictus, Bluespotted seabream (Valenciennes, 1830) 	
Pagrus major, Red seabream (Temminck & Schlegel, 1843) 	
Pagrus pagrus, Common seabream, or red porgy (Linnaeus, 1758)

References

 
Marine fish genera
Eocene genus first appearances
Taxa named by Georges Cuvier
Taxonomy articles created by Polbot